Kirill Premudrov (born 11 June 1992) is a Belarusian professional footballer who plays for Torpedo-BelAZ Zhodino.

Honours
Dinamo Brest
Belarusian Cup winner: 2017–18
Belarusian Super Cup winner: 2018

External links 
 
 
 Profile at Dinamo Brest website

1992 births
Living people
Sportspeople from Brest, Belarus
Belarusian footballers
Association football midfielders
FC Dynamo Brest players
FC Dinamo Minsk players
FC Luch Minsk (2012) players
FC Torpedo-BelAZ Zhodino players